Gothenburg International Bioscience Business School (GIBBS) is an educational platform with a focus on business creation within the bio- and life sciences in Gothenburg, Sweden.

As a student at the school you are studying intellectual property, management, economics and business development. 
The skills and tools to drive innovation and growth are learned by increasingly acknowledged pedagogy—‘experiential knowledge’ and ‘team based learning’, allowing the students to learn-by-doing. The programme is an international, action-based, and multi-disciplinary education where the education platform calls for special competencies and resources. Consequently, students engage in “real-life” commercialization project supported by instructors that apply their entrepreneurial experiences and network to the exclusive pedagogical experience offered to an exclusive pick of students.

The education is a collaboration between Sahlgrenska Academy at Göteborg University and Chalmers University of Technology and is a part of the Center for Intellectual Property Studies, CIP. Most of the collaboration is during the first year with a shared curriculum studying with peers from various backgrounds such as law, engineering, life sciences, and management. The second year students work in groups with the innovation project with the aim to commercialize an innovation.

The University of Gothenburg an education geared towards life science students who become entrepreneurial project leaders ready to deal uncertainties and distinct dynamics that life science industry and start-ups. The graduates from the programme are not only well versed in their respective life science fields; uniquely, they are also entrepreneurial project leaders. An essential mix that prepares them for the distinctive life science market dynamics in their chosen career, equipped to recognize possibilities and create growth.

Chalmers University of Technology offers an education geared towards engineers in technology based ventures.

External links 
 University of Gothenburg GIBBS Official Site
 Chalmers GIBBS Official Site
 CIP Official Site

University of Gothenburg
Chalmers University of Technology
Life sciences industry